Semnam is an aboriginal Mon–Khmer language spoken by the Semnam subtribe of the Lanoh people in Peninsular Malaysia.

References

External links 
 http://projekt.ht.lu.se/rwaai RWAAI (Repository and Workspace for Austroasiatic Intangible Heritage)
 http://hdl.handle.net/10050/00-0000-0000-0003-66F2-3@view Semnam in RWAAI Digital Archive

Languages of Malaysia
Aslian languages